Matthew or Matt Stephens may refer to:

Matthew Stephens (statistician) (born 1970), statistician and professor at the University of Chicago
Matthew Stephens (cyclist) (born 1970), British road racing cyclist
Matthew Stephens, co-creator of DeviantArt
Matt Stephens (born 1971), author
Matt Stephens (politician) (1926–2017), former Western Australian politician

See also
Matthew Stevens (disambiguation)